Joseph Samuel ( – April 1806) was an Englishman known for having survived his execution attempts.

Britain then maintained a penal settlement at Sydney Cove in the Colony of New South Wales. Security in the early penal settlements was reinforced by the isolation of the colony: guards trusted the Australian wilderness to kill any convicts who attempted to escape.

Samuel succeeded in escaping and, with a gang, robbed the home of a wealthy woman, and in the process, a policeman named Joseph Luker, who was guarding her home, was murdered. The gang was hunted down and quickly captured, and during the trial, the woman recognised Joseph Samuel as one of the culprits. He confessed to robbing her home, but denied having murdered the policeman. The other members of the gang, including the leader, were acquitted due to lack of evidence, but because the woman identified Samuel, he was convicted and sentenced to death by hanging.

Execution attempts

On 26 September 1803, Samuel and another criminal, convicted of another crime and not a member of the same gang, were driven in a cart to Parramatta, where hundreds of people had gathered to watch the execution. Nooses were fastened securely around their necks from the gallows and after they were allowed to pray with a priest, the cart was driven away. This was the common method of hanging of the day, and caused death by slow strangulation.  Not until the latter half of the 19th century did the British employ the drop method, which breaks the neck.

The ropes used were made of five cords of hemp, which enabled one to hold , for up to five minutes without breaking, more than sufficient for human executions. The other criminal ultimately died by strangulation, but Samuel's rope snapped and he dropped to his feet, sprained an ankle and collapsed. The executioner hastily readied another rope, also five-hemp, and placed it around Samuel's neck, forced him onto the same cart, and drove the cart away again. The other criminal was still kicking weakly at this point.

When the cart drove out from under him, Samuel fell again, and the noose slipped off his neck, whereupon his boots touched the ground.  The executioner was sure to have fastened the noose securely around his neck, and as he stood Samuel up to try again, the crowd had become boisterous, calling for Samuel to be freed. The executioner very quickly readied another five-hemp rope, ordered the cart driven back, forced Samuel onto it, fastened the noose around his neck, secured it very carefully and tightly, and then ordered the cart driven away. The rope snapped, and Samuel dropped to the ground and stumbled over, trying to avoid landing on his sprained ankle.

Now the crowd stood around in an uproar, and another policeman, watching on horseback, ordered the execution delayed momentarily, while he rode away to find the governor. The governor was summoned to the scene and upon inspection of the ropes, which showed no evidence of having been cut, and the other criminal, who was successfully executed with an identical rope, the governor and the entire crowd agreed that it was a sign from God that Joseph Samuel had not committed any crime deserving of execution and his sentence was commuted to life imprisonment instead. Parramatta's town doctor tended to his sprained ankle.

See also
 John Babbacombe Lee
 Willie Francis

References

1806 deaths
Australian people convicted of murdering police officers
British people convicted of murdering police officers
English criminals
Execution survivors
Convicts transported to Australia
Year of birth uncertain